Barış Kılıç (born 1978) is a Turkish actor.

Life and career 
Barış Kılıç was born 1978 in Arguvan. His family moved to Istanbul when he was 5. After studying at Okmeydanı Anadolu High School, he graduated from Istanbul University School of Economics. He then briefly lived in the United States before returning to Turkey and receiving his master's degree from Yeditepe University. While in university he acted in commercials. He made his television debut in 2004 with a role in Bütün Çocuklarım, acting alongside Kadir İnanır and Menderes Samancılar. He married Ayşegül in 2007, with whom he has two sons. In 2011, he portrayed the character of Levent Adını Feriha Koydum. In 2014, he joined the cast of Güllerin Savaşı and shared the leading role with Canan Ergüder and Damla Sönmez. He made his cinematic debut in 2014 in Biray Dalkıran's movie Seni Seviyorum Adamım. He further rose to prominence with his role in Yasak Elma.

Filmography

References

External links 
 
 

Living people
1978 births
Turkish male television actors
Turkish male film actors
Istanbul University alumni